Sky Glabush (born 1970) is a Canadian artist based in Southwestern Ontario. He has created works in a number of media, but is best known as a painter. He is an associate professor of visual art at the University of Western Ontario.
His work is in the collection of the National Gallery of Canada.

Early life and education 
Glabush was born in Alert Bay, British Columbia.  He graduated with a Bachelor of Fine Arts from the University of Saskatchewan and a Masters of Fine Arts from the University of Alberta. Glabush is a Baháʼí, and the Baháʼí Faith is significant to his work.

Career
In 2006 Glabush began teaching art at the University of Western Ontario. That year he held his first solo exhibition, Provisional Structures. In 2009 he exhibited Renting, a series of paintings of rental properties.

Over the next several years Glabush created and exhibited artwork in a variety of media, including sculpture, pottery, weaving and large-scale paintings. In 2016 he exhibited a series of neo-Modernist sculpture and tapestries at the Oakville Galleries, as well as holding an exhibition of woven artworks in Norway.

In 2020 Glabush travelled to Guyana, where he taught art to the inmates of prisons. That year two of his large-scale paintings were added to the collection of the National Gallery of Canada.

Exhibitions

Solo shows 
Provisional Structures, University of Alberta, (2006)
Homes for Canada, University of Manitoba (2007)
Renting, MKG127, Toronto Ontario (2009)
Background, MKG127, Toronto Ontario(2011)
The Kingdom on Names Thames Art Gallery, Chatham Ontario (2012)
Display, MKG127, Toronto, Ontario (2014)
What is a self? Oakville Galleries, oakville, Ontario (2016)
The Window is Also a Door, Prosjektrom Normanns, Stavanger, Norway (2016)
A new Garden, MKG127, Toronto, Ontario (2017)
The Valley of Love, Clint Roenisch, Toronto, Ontario (2018)
Projet Pangée, Montreal, Quebec (2018)
The Structure of Painting, Philip Martin Gallery, Los Angeles, California (2020)
The Caged Lark, Philip Martin Gallery, Los Angeles, California (2021)
Weight of Light, Philip Martin Gallery, Los Angeles, California (2021)

Group shows 
Here and Now (2005)
Canada Calling (2006)
Hinterland (2008)
Allure of the Local (2009)
A Sudden Frost (2010)
The Painting Project (2013)
Go Figure (2011)
Untitled Art Show (2014)
Stellar Living (2015)
Again, and Again (2017)
A Home in the Country (2018)
Thinking with My Hands (2018)
From Within (2020)
Unnatural Nature (2022)

References

External links 
"Professor’s works rank among Canadian treasures". Western News, December 17, 2015 By Jason Winders
What is a Self? by John Davies
Sky Glabush Biography: By Contemporary Art Magazine
Sky Glabush Website
Sky Glabush profile at Western Faculty of Visual Arts

1970 births
Living people
Canadian male sculptors
Canadian contemporary artists
Artists from British Columbia
Artists from London, Ontario
Canadian Bahá'ís
Canadian potters
Canadian weavers
People from Alert Bay
Tapestry artists
Academic staff of the University of Western Ontario
University of Saskatchewan alumni
University of Alberta alumni
21st-century Canadian painters
21st-century Canadian sculptors
21st-century Canadian male artists